Eunan O'Halpin is Bank of Ireland Professor of Contemporary Irish History at Trinity College Dublin. He was educated at Gonzaga College, Dublin, received his BA and MA from University College Dublin and received a PhD from the University of Cambridge.

O'Halpin specialises in 20th century Irish and British history and politics. Since 2002, he has been a member of the National Archives Advisory Council. He is also a member of the Royal Irish Academy National Committee for History, the Royal Irish Academy National Committee for the Study of International Relations and of the Katherine Kavanagh Trust. He is a grandnephew of Kevin Barry, grandson of Kathleen Barry Moloney and great-grandson of Anti-Treaty Sinn Fein TD for Tipperary South, P. J. Moloney.

In 2013, O'Halpin presented In the Name of the Republic, which was shown on TV3.

Published works
 The Decline of the Union: British government in Ireland 1892-1920, Gill and Macmillan, 1987.
 Head of the Civil Service: A study of Sir Warren Fisher, Routledge, 1989.
 Defending Ireland: The Irish state and its enemies since 1922, Oxford University Press, 1999.
 Spying on Ireland: British intelligence and Irish neutrality, Oxford University Press, 2008. 
Dead of the Irish Revolution, Yale University Press, 2020 - with Daithi O Corrain.
 Kevin Barry: The short life of an Irish rebel, Merrion Press, 2020.

References

External links
 'Sir Warren Fisher, Head of the Civil Service 1919 - 1939', PhD thesis by Eunan O'Halpin

Academics of Trinity College Dublin
Contemporary historians
21st-century Irish historians
Living people
People educated at Gonzaga College
Year of birth missing (living people)